Les Moitiers-en-Bauptois is a former commune in the Manche department in Normandy in north-western France. On 1 January 2017, it was merged into the commune Picauville.

See also
Communes of the Manche department

References

Moitiersenbauptois